Vellayani Lake, or Vellayani Kayal as known in local language, is the largest fresh water lake in Thiruvananthapuram district, of Kerala, India.

Location
It is around 9 km away from the Thiruvananthapuram Central Bus Station at Thampanoor. Buses ply to Vellayani Lake from City Depot at East Fort also. It is at a distance of  7 km from Kovalam via Poonkulam junction.

Attractions
A road passes through this lake; a bund has been constructed for this purpose. This lake attracts a lot of tourists. Once in Kovalam, a visitor should not allow to miss the opportunity of seeing this wonder lake of freshwater. Its crystal-clear calm water, especially during moonlit nights, is a craze for the minds. The locals say a side of the lake is Kochu Kovalam, meaning tiny Kovalam.

There is a boat race in the lake during Onam which attracts a huge crowd. Country boat service is available from Kovalam beach to reach the lake.

Threats to the Lake
There was a move to drain the lake and use the reclaimed area for agriculture. It was resisted by locals and environmentalists and has been shelved.
Illegal sand mining, pollution and land reclamation is affecting the condition of the lake.

Vavvamoola kadavinmoola bund road 
The  bund road in the Northern side of Kakkamoola-Trivandrum road  connecting  Vavvamoola and kadavinmoola. The drinking water supply for the Vizhinjam International Seaport is operated  from this vellayani lake.
 and pump house is situated in kadavinmoola beside the bund road. The Road was renovated in December 2015. It also has concrete benches in the roadside to attract tourists. It is good picnic spot for urban people.

References

External links 

 Wikimapia
 https://www.tripadvisor.in/Attraction_Review-g311295-d4151733-Reviews-Vellayani_Lake-Kovalam_Thiruvananthapuram_District_Kerala.html

Lakes of Kerala